Beaufai is a commune in the Orne department in the Normandy region in northwestern France.

Populations

See also
Communes of the Orne department

References

Communes of Orne